C More Hockey is an ice hockey channel broadcasting in Sweden and Norway. The channel shows ice hockey from Sweden and other countries.

References

External links

Television channels in Sweden
Television channels in Norway